Telephone numbers in Russia are administered by Roskomnadzor, a Russian federal agency for communication and media. Russia's National Numbering Plan (NNP) is a four-level telephone numbering plan with local, zone, country, and international scopes, implementing a closed numbering plan, in which the number of digits of all national significant numbers (NSN) assigned to subscriber telephones is fixed at ten, with three digits for the area code, and a seven-digit subscriber number which includes a zone code of up to two digits. Internationally, Russia participates in the numbering plans of the International Telecommunication Union (ITU) provided by recommendations E.164 and E.123, using the telephone country code 7.

Russia has shared its numbering plan with Kazakhstan, designating two area codes for routing calls to that country. Kazakhstan was assigned an autonomous country code by the ITU, and is in a permissive dialing period until 2025, during which it is permissible to still dial the Russian prefixes.

History
After the breakup of the Soviet Union, the country used an open numbering plan, having a varying number of digits. Local telecommunications regulators had planned to abandon this system by 2009, but postponed the changeover until 2010, later pushed once more until 2012 and finally approved for implementation in the period of 2020–2025.

Historically, country code 7 was used as the country calling code for all of the Soviet Union. Following the Soviet break-up, all of its former republics, save for Russia and Kazakhstan, switched to new country codes. Following Abkhazia's secession from Georgia, Abkhazia switched to the Russian telephone codes 7 840 for landlines and 7 940 for mobile phones, although it still can be reached via the Georgian telephone code 995 44.

Long-distance and international prefixes 
The international dialing prefix in Russia is "8~10"—callers dial "8", wait for a tone, and then dial "10", followed by the country code, area code, and number. The long-distance prefix is "8~". Plans exist to change those prefixes to "0" for national and "00" for international dialing, to be implemented by 2020.

Placing long-distance and international calls
For reaching long-distance and international destinations from a fixed line, a subscriber may select from two services: Pre-Select or Hot-Choice. With Pre-Select, the subscriber calls a prescribed free number (8-800-333-0990 for MTT or 8-800-100-2525 RT) and signs up initially for service. They may also sign a statement at the phone company indicating their choice of provider. With this provider, the prefixes and dialing procedures for non-local calls are the ones currently in use.

The default regulation in Moscow is Hot-Choice (not available yet on all exchanges; regional operators apply their own regulation depending on availability). Available operators are:
 Rostelecom
 Interregional TransitTelekom (MTT)
 Golden Telecom (Sovintel (GT))—not active on consumer market
 TransTelekom (TTK)—not active on consumer market
 Orange—not active on consumer market
 Comstar—only active in Moscow
 Arctel—not active on consumer market
 Synterra Media—not active on consumer market

The dialing pattern for Hot-Choice subscribers is different. After dialing "8", the subscriber waits for a tone and then dials the operator code (OC) either for a long-distance call or an international call.

Dialing pattern 
Note: the tone signal after dialing "8" is compulsory on old analog exchanges and optional on digital exchanges.

Calls within a city or region 
xxx-xx-xx (exception: Moscow—see below), e.g.:

 3-45-67
 22-33-44
 234-56-78

Local phone numbers in Russia may be made up of five (x-xx-xx), six (xx-xx-xx), or seven (xxx-xx-xx) digits.

Moscow City has three area codes assigned: 495, 498 and 499:
 when calling from any zone to 499:           8 499 xxx-xx-xx
 when calling from any zone to 498:           8 498 xxx-xx-xx
 when calling from any zone to 495:           8 495 xxx-xx-xx

Calls between these codes are local calls and are not charged at long-distance rates.

Calls between cities/regions within Russia 
Pre-Selected Operator: 8-tone-ABC xxx-xx-xx  (where ABC is the area code)

 e.g. 8 812 234-56-78 (to St. Petersburg)

Hot-Choice Operator selection: 8-tone-OC ABC xxx-xx-xx  (where OC is the Operator Code and ABC is the area code)

 e.g. 8-53 812 234-56-78 (to St. Petersburg via MTT)

International calls from Russia 
Pre-Selected Operator: 8-tone-10 International number

 e.g. 8-10 44 20 7946-0123 (to London/UK)

Hot-Choice Operator selection: 8-tone-OC International number where OC is the Operator Code

 e.g. 8-58 44 20 7946-0123 (to London/UK via MTT)

Calls from outside Russia 
+7 ABC xxx-xx-xx
where ABC is the area code

Area codes

List of area codes in Russia 
The dialing code range 4xx was introduced on 1 December 2005 to replace 0xx, in order to make it possible to adopt the ITU convention of 0 and 00 dialing prefixes for local and international dialing respectively. The old '095' dialing code, along with 19 other Russian area codes starting with '0', expired on 31 January 2006.

On 7 May 2022, following the annexation of Donetsk and Lugansk by Russian forces, the two oblasts were integrated into the Russian numbering plan.

Toll-free & pay-line codes

Special numbers (emergencies) 

In a press conference in December 2013 Minister of Emergency Situations, Vladimir Puchkov said that the unified system runs in a full pilot mode from 2014 and will fully enter to operational mode in 2016.

See also
Telecommunications in Russia
Telephone numbers in Kazakhstan

Notes

References

Russia
Telecommunications in Russia
Telephone numbers